Bowlee is a village in Greater Manchester, England. Bowlee is situated along the Heywood Old Road (A6045) on the outskirts of Middleton between Rhodes and Heywood. Historically it forms part of Lancashire.

RAF Bowlee
The RAF acquired  of land between Bowlee and the nearby village of Birch:  of land were acquired from the Langley Hall Estate plus  from Manchester Corporation.

Car boot sales
Large regular car boots sales are held during the summer months at the Bowlee Community Park.

Public transport
The area is served by bus service 125 which is the Middleton, Rhodes, Birch, Langley, Alkrington circular which operates mornings and afternoons only from Mondays to Saturdays.

References

Villages in Greater Manchester
Middleton, Greater Manchester